Trump rally may refer to:
 List of rallies for the 2016 Donald Trump presidential campaign
 List of post–2016 election Donald Trump rallies
 List of rallies for the 2024 Donald Trump presidential campaign